Alsónána is a village in Tolna County, Hungary. Residents are Magyars, with minority of Serbs.

References

Populated places in Tolna County
Serb communities in Hungary